Dialysis rufithorax is a species of fly in the family Xylophagidae.

Distribution
United States.

References

Xylophagidae
Insects described in 1823
Taxa named by Thomas Say
Diptera of North America